Mika Lipponen (born 9 May 1964) is a Finnish former footballer.

Playing career
Lipponen played in Finland for TPS, in Spain for Real Mallorca, in the Netherlands for FC Twente and BVO Emmen, and in Switzerland for FC Aarau. He also played for the Finnish national side.

Later career
After working as a scout for Feyenoord for 20 years, in December 2020 he began scouting for PSV.

References

1964 births
Living people
People from Kaarina
Finnish footballers
Finnish expatriate footballers
Finland international footballers
FC Twente players
Turun Palloseura footballers
RCD Mallorca players
FC Aarau players
Eredivisie players
Association football forwards
Association football scouts
Feyenoord non-playing staff
PSV Eindhoven non-playing staff
Mestaruussarja players
Sportspeople from Southwest Finland